Cracovia is Polish brand of vodka produced by distillery Polmos Kraków since 1995.
 
There are three varieties of this vodka:
 Cracovia Classic, 40% abv
 Cracovia Supreme, 42% abv
 Cracovia Very Old, 40% abv – dry mixed vodka aged in oak barrels

External links
 Distillery "Polmos" in Cracow - Awards

References

Polish vodkas
Companies based in Kraków